Sarajevska pivara (SASE: SRPVRK1) is a Bosnian brewing company based in Sarajevo.

History
The Sarajevska pivara opened in 1864 as the first local industry and shortly became one of the leading producers in Bosnia, with considerable amounts exported to Montenegro, Croatia and Albania. Just before World War I, Sarajevska Pivara was producing 116,000 hectoliters per year, and in 1916 it passed the limit of 150,000 hl.

Today's President of the Steering Board, Mr. Hilmo Selimović, was appointed to a position of Sarajevska pivara d.d. General Director on 1 August 1983. Since that period, Sarajevska Pivara had steady production growth that had growth from 299,000 hectoliters in 1984 to 784,000 hectoliters in 1991. With these results, Sarajevska Pivara became one of the four leading companies in the former Socialist Federal Republic of Yugoslavia.

Brands
Sarajevsko, lager
Sarajevsko Premium
0% beer
Lejla voda

Licences:
Pepsi
Oettinger

Museum
The brewery hosts a museum, explaining the company's history throughout Ottoman times, the Austro-Hungarian Empire, the Socialist Federal Republic of Yugoslavia and the War in Bosnia.

References

Beer in Bosnia and Herzegovina
Companies based in Sarajevo
Companies established in 1864
Brands of Bosnia and Herzegovina